Bucculatrix caribbea is a moth species in the family Bucculatricidae and was first described in 2002 by Donald R. Davis and Bernard Landry. It is found on the island of Cozumel (Mexico) and Glovers Reef in Belize, but it is probably widespread along coastal areas in many parts of the Caribbean region.

The length of the forewings is 2–2.3 mm. The forewings are white, densely covered with dark brownish fuscous scales. The hindwings are pale grey.

The larvae feed on Cordia sebestena. They mine the leaves of their host plant. The mine starts as a serpentine mine, which is later enlarged to a small, full depth blotch. 
The black frass is deposited in the serpentine portion of the mine and partway along either side of the blotch. Older larvae feed externally, skeletonizing small patches of leaf. Pupation takes place in a cocoon, which is spun on the underside of the leaf, mostly near the midrib.

Etymology
The species name refers to the Caribbean, the geographical regional name of the area of distribution.

References

Bucculatricidae
Leaf miners
Moths described in 2002
Moths of the Caribbean